Aziz Bolotovich Beishenaliev (Russian: Бейшеналиев Азиз Болотович) is a Kyrgyz actor from Russia. He was born on March 15, 1971. His father, Bolot Beishenaliev, is regarded as a prominent Kyrgyz film actor born in Kyrgyzstan.

From 1990 until 1992, he studied at Tashkent State University of Oriental Studies (Vostochka), Tashkent, Uzbekistan.

Filmography 

 Great Emir Temur (Буюк Амир Темур), Director: Isamat Ergashev, Bako Sadykov, Uzbekistan,1996
 Drongo (Дронго) TV series, Director: Zinovii Roizman, Russia, 2002
 Trio (Трио), Director: Aleksandr Proshkin, Russia, 2003
 The Jackpot for Cinderella (Джек-пот для Золушки), Director: Nikolai Stambula, Kazakhstan, 2004
 Wealth (Богатство), TV series, Director: Eldor Magomatovich Urazbayev, Russia, 2004
 The Great Dynasties (Великие династии), Director: Anna Melikian, Russia,  2005
 Mahambet's Match - The Red Woodworm (Меч Махамбета - Красная полынь), Director: Slambek Tauekel Kazakhstan, 2006
 The Nomad (Кочевник), Director: Sergei Bodrov, Ivan Passer, Russia, Kazakhstan, 2006
 Birds of Paradise (Зымак кыстары Райские птицы), Director: Talgat Asyrankulov, Gaziz Nasyrov, Kyrgyzstan, Kazakhstan 2006
 Paragraph 78 (Параграф 78) Director: Mikhael Khleborodov, Russia, 2007
 Paragraph 78:Second movie (Параграф 78 - филм второй), Director: Mikhael Khleborodov, Russia, 2007
 Mustafa Shokai (Мустафа Чокай - Мустафа Шокай) Director: Satybaldy Narymbetor, Kazakhstan, 2008
 Fields, clowns, apples... (Поле, клоуны, яблоко ... ), Director: Șota Gomisoniia Russia 2008
 Semin (Семин), TV series, Director: Gennadi Baisak, Aleksandr Franskevich, Russia 2009
 The House near the Lake, (Дом на Озерной), Director Serik Aprymov, Russia, 2009
 Jumping Delfin Bottlenose, (Прыжок Афалины), Director: Eldor Magomatovich Urazbayev Russia, Kazakhstan, 2009
 The story of the pilot (История летчика), Director Yelena Nikolayeva, Arkadi Kaplun, Kazakhstan 2009
 The Liquidator (Лектор''), Director: Vadim Shmelev Kazakhstan, 2010

References
 
 http://ruskino.ru/art/5738

Kyrgyzstani male actors
Living people
20th-century Kyrgyzstani actors
21st-century Kyrgyzstani actors
1971 births
Tashkent State University of Oriental Studies alumni